Giulia Guarieiro (born 24 July 1995) is a Brazilian handball player who plays as a left back for BM Granollers and for Brazil internationally. She made her Olympic debut representing Brazil at the 2020 Summer Olympics.

She was chosen as the best left back of the Liga Guerreras Iberdrola, the highest women’s handball competition in Spain, in two consecutive seasons (2018/2019 and 2019/2020). In season 2018/2019 she scored 122 goals. And in season 2019/2020 she scored 92 goals in 16 matches.

She was included in the Brazilian squad in the women's handball competition for the 2020 Summer Olympics.

Giulia Guarieiro was also included in the squad of Brazil in the 25th IHF Women's World Championship played in Spain in December 2021.

References 

1995 births
Living people
Brazilian female handball players
Olympic handball players of Brazil
Handball players at the 2020 Summer Olympics
20th-century Brazilian women
21st-century Brazilian women